South Africa women's national basketball team is the national basketball team representing South Africa at world basketball competitions for women. The team is administered by Basketball South Africa.

Results

African Championship
 1993 : 8th
 1994 : 6th
 2003 : 9th
 2009 : 11th
 2015 : 12th

See also
 South Africa women's national under-19 basketball team
 South Africa women's national under-17 basketball team
 South Africa women's national 3x3 team

References

External links
 FIBA profile
 South Africa Basketball Records at FIBA Archive
 Africabasket - South Africa Women National Team
 MyBasketball South Africa

 
Women's national basketball teams